Stephan Hartmann (born 1 March 1968) is a German philosopher and Professor of Philosophy of Science at Ludwig Maximilian University of Munich, known for his contributions to formal epistemology.

Biography
Hartmann received his PhD from Justus Liebig University in Giessen, Germany in 1995. He started his academic career at the University of Washington and the University of Pittsburgh. Back in Germany in 2002 at the University of Konstanz he headed the research group Philosophy, Probability and Modelling together with Luc Bovens.

From 2004 to 2006 he led the Centre for Philosophy of Natural and Social Science (CPNSS) at the London School of Economics and Political Science, and became Professor in LSE's Department of Philosophy, Logic and Scientific Method. In 2007 he became Professor of Philosophy at the Tilburg University, The Netherlands, where he founded and led the Tilburg Center for Logic and Philosophy of Science (TiLPS).

In 2012 Hartmann became Professor of Philosophy of Science in the Faculty of Philosophy, Philosophy of Science and the Study of Religion at LMU Munich, where he also is co-director of the Munich Center for Mathematical Philosophy (MCMP). Hartmann is President of the European Philosophy of Science Association (2013–17) and President of the European Society for Analytic Philosophy (2014-2017). Since 2016, he is a member of the German National Academy of Sciences, Leopoldina, and since 2019, he is a member of the Bavarian Academy of Sciences and Humanities.

Publications 
 2003. Bayesian Epistemology (with Luc Bovens). Oxford: Oxford University Press.
 2006. Models in Science (with Roman Frigg). In E. Zalta (ed.): The Stanford Encyclopedia of Philosophy.
 2011. Probabilities in Physics (ed. with Claus Beisbart). Oxford: Oxford University Press.
 2011. Explanation, Prediction, and Confirmation (ed. with Dennis Dieks, Wenceslao J. Gonzalez, Thomas Uebel and Marcel Weber). Berlin: Springer. (The Philosophy of Science in a European Perspective series).
 2019. Bayesian Philosophy of Science (with Jan Sprenger). Oxford: Oxford University Press.

References

External links 
 Personal webpage
 Alexander von Humboldt Professorship 2013

1968 births
Living people
20th-century German philosophers
German male writers
Members of the German Academy of Sciences Leopoldina
21st-century German philosophers